Bernie Ryan (10 August 1934 – 12 August 2017) was an Australian rules footballer who played for the Geelong Football Club in the Victorian Football League (VFL).

References

External links 
 
 
 Bernie Ryan: ''Boyles Football Photos.

1934 births
Australian rules footballers from Victoria (Australia)
Geelong Football Club players
Yarrawonga Football Club players
2017 deaths